Tess Feury (born March 15, 1996) is an American rugby union player. She made her debut for the United States in 2016 against England at the Women's Super Series in Salt Lake City, Utah. She was selected for the Eagles 2017 Women's Rugby World Cup squad.

Biography 
Feury captained the United States Girls team at the 2014 Summer Youth Olympics.

Feury graduated from the Pennsylvania State University where she majored in Nursing and played for their women’s rugby team. She grew up playing rugby; her father was introduced to the sport when he attended Rutgers University. He started an American Flag Rugby Program which allowed his sons and daughter to play rugby.

Feury currently works as a Pediatric Intensive Care Nurse at Morristown Medical Center.

In 2022, she was named in the Eagles squad for the Pacific Four Series in New Zealand. She was selected in the Eagles squad for the 2021 Rugby World Cup in New Zealand.

References

External links 
 Eagles Profile

1996 births
Living people
United States women's international rugby union players
American female rugby union players
Rugby sevens players at the 2014 Summer Youth Olympics
21st-century American women